St Neots railway station serves the town of St Neots in Cambridgeshire, England. It is located to the east of the town approximately 1.5 miles from the town centre. The station is managed by Great Northern, although most services are operated by Thameslink.

The station has two large island platforms and four main rail lines, a pair of "up and down" slow lines used by stopping services and a pair of "up and down" fast lines used by fast Great Northern services that stop there during peak times and for high speed services passing through.

History
St Neots was one of the original stations, opening with the line on 7 August 1850.

It was the scene of a derailment of a Scottish night express in 1895.

Facilities

There are toilet facilities at the station and a newsagent/coffee seller in the ticket hall. A taxi office is situated outside the station, where minicabs can be booked.

St Neots station has automatic ticket barriers, which were installed in 2008 by former franchise holder First Capital Connect, which has led to the station being staffed for longer hours, and the station also has help points throughout.

Services
Off-peak, all services at St Neots are operated by Thameslink using  EMUs.

The typical off-peak service in trains per hour is:
 2 tph to  via ,  and 

On Sundays, the service is reduced to hourly and southbound services run to London King's Cross instead of Horsham.

The station is also served by several buses, with routes to St Neots town centre, Eaton Ford, Eaton Socon, Loves Farm, Cambridge, and Eynesbury.

Recent developments
A  new footbridge opened in February 2014, providing lifts to the platforms and access to the station from both sides of the track including access to the Love's Farm housing development.

Location

References

External links

Railway stations in Cambridgeshire
DfT Category D stations
Former Great Northern Railway stations
Railway stations in Great Britain opened in 1850
Railway stations served by Govia Thameslink Railway
Railway station